This is a list of notable painters from, or associated with, Austria.

A
 Josef Abel (1768–1818)
 Fritz Aigner (1930–2005)
 Joseph Matthäus Aigner (1818–1886)
 Tivadar Alconiere (1797–1865)
 Oz Almog (born 1956)
 Franz Alt (1821–1914)
 Rudolf von Alt (1812–1905)
 Anton Altmann (1808–1871)
 Friedrich von Amerling (1803–1887)
 Heinz Anger (born 1941)
 Christian Attersee (born 1940)
 Josef Maria Auchentaller (1865–1949)

B
 Alfred Basel (1876–1920)
 Herbert Bayer (1900–1985) 
 Franz von Bayros (1866–1924)
 Tommaso Benedetti (1797–1863)
 Julius Victor Berger (1850–1902)
 Joseph Bergler (1753–1829)
 Joseph Binder (1798–1864)
 Eduard Bitterlich (1833–1872)
 Karl von Blaas (1815–1894)
 Tina Blau (1845–1916)
 Otto Böhler (1847–1913)
 Friedrich August Brand (1735–1806)
 Antonietta Brandeis (1849–1910)
 Arik Brauer (1929–2021)
 Günter Brus (born 1938)

C
 Hans Canon (1829–1885)
 Franz Caucig (1755–1828)
 Edgar Chahine (1874–1947)
 Eduard Charlemont (1848–1906)
 Hugo Charlemont (1850–1939)
 Franz Cižek (1865–1946)
 Johann Nepomuk della Croce (1736–1819)
 Carl Otto Czeschka (1878–1960)

D
 Alexander Johann Dallinger von Dalling (1783–1844)
 Johann Dallinger von Dalling (1741–1806)
 Johann Baptist Dallinger von Dalling (1782–1868)
 Josef Danhauser (1805–1845)
 Hugo Darnaut (1851–1937)
 Franz Defregger (1835–1921)
 Anton Depauly (1801–1866)
 Ludwig Deutsch (1855–1935)
 Johann Conrad Dorner (1810–1866)
 Johann Baptist Drechsler (1766–1811)

E
 Johann Georg Edlinger (1741–1819)
 Albin Egger-Lienz (1868–1926)
 Marie Egner (1850–1940)
 Bettina Ehrlich (1903–1985)
 Anton Einsle (1801–1871)
 Franz Eisenhut (1857–1903)
 August Eisenmenger (1830–1907)
 Rudolf Eisenmenger (1902–1994)
 Eduard Ender (1822–1883)
 Johann Ender (1793–1854)
 Thomas Ender (1793–1875)
 Eduard von Engerth (1818–1897)
 Rudolf Ernst (1854–1932)
 Franz Eybl (1806–1880)

F
 Anton Faistauer (1887–1930)
 Bernd Fasching (born 1955)
 Eugen Felix (1836–1906)
 Peter Fendi (1796–1842)
 Johann Fischbach (1797–1871)
 Ludwig Hans Fischer (1848–1915)
 Vinzenz Fischer (1729–1810)
 Camilla Friedländer (1856−1928)
 Friedrich Ritter von Friedländer-Malheim (1825–1901)
 Emil Fuchs (1866–1929)
 Ernst Fuchs (1930–2015)
 Joseph von Führich (1800–1876)

G
 Friedrich Gauermann (1807–1862)
 Peter Johann Nepomuk Geiger (1805–1880)
 Richard Geiger (1870–1945)
 Franz Geyling (1803–1875)
 Richard Gerstl (1883–1908)
 Luigi Gillarduzzi (1822–1856)
 Hilda Goldwag (1912–2008)
 Alexander Demetrius Goltz (1857–1944)
 Helmuth Gräff (born 1958)
 Matthias Laurenz Gräff (born 1984)
 Josef Grassi (1757–1838)
 Christian Griepenkerl (1839–1916)
 Eduard Gurk (1801–1841)
 Ludwig Guttenbrunn (1750–1819)

H

 Gabriel von Hackl (1843–1926)
 Robert Hammerstiel (1933–2020)
 Anton Hansch (1813–1876)
 Anton Hartinger (1806–1890)
 Rudolf Hausner (1914–1995) 
 Xenia Hausner (born 1951)
 Joseph Heicke (1811–1861)
 Gottfried Helnwein (born 1948)
 Mercedes Helnwein (born 1979)
 Claudius Herr (1775–1838)
 Louis Christian Hess (1895–1944)

 Adolf Hitler (1889–1945)
 Johann Nepomuk Hoechle (1790–1835)
 Rudolf Alfred Höger (1877–1930)
 Wolfgang Hollegha (born 1929)
 Stephanie Hollenstein (1886–1944)
 Theodor von Hörmann (1840–1895)
 Alfred Hrdlicka (1928–2009)
 Adolf Humborg (1847–1921)
 Friedensreich Hundertwasser (1928–2000)

J
 Adam Jankowski (born 1948)
 Fritz Janschka (1919–2016)
 Rudolf Jettmar (1869–1939)

K
 Alexander Kaiser (1819–1872)
 Eduard Kaiser (1820–1895)
 Hermann Kern (1838–1912)
 Alexander Kircher (1867–1939)
 Raphael Kirchner (1876–1917)
 Ernst Klimt (1864–1892)
 Gustav Klimt (1862–1918)
 Julius Klinger (1876–1942)
 Martin Knoller (1725–1804)
 Ludwig Koch (1866–1934)
 Kiki Kogelnik (1935–1997)
 Oskar Kokoschka (1886–1980)
 Friedrich König (1857–1941)
 Rudolf Kortokraks (1928–2014)
 Barbara Krafft (1764–1825)
 Johann Peter Krafft (1780–1856)
 Johann Victor Krämer (1861–1949)
 Siegfried L. Kratochwil (1916–2005)
 Joseph Kreutzinger (1757–1829)
 Josef Kriehuber (1757–1829)
 Carl Kronberger (1800–1876)
 Elke Krystufek (born 1970)
 Alfred Kubin (1877–1959)
 Leopold Kupelwieser (1796–1862)
 Max Kurzweil (1867–1916) 
 Karl Joseph Kuwasseg (1802–1877)

L
 Demeter Laccataris (1798–1864)
 Siegmund L'Allemand (1840–1910)
 Johann Baptist von Lampi the Elder (1751–1830)
 Johann Baptist von Lampi the Younger (1775–1837)
 Hans Larwin (1873–1938)
 Maria Lassnig (1919–2014)
 Helmut Leherb (1933–1997)
 Anton Lehmden (1929–2018)
 Felix Ivo Leicher (1727–1812)
 Maximilian Liebenwein (1869–1926)
 Bertold Löffler (1874–1960)
 Friedrich Loos (1797–1890)

M
 Georg Mader (1824–1881)
 Hans Makart (1840–1884)
 Anton von Maron (1733–1808)
 Franz von Matsch (1861–1942)
 Hubert Maurer (1738–1818)
 Gabriel von Max (1840–1915)
 Georg Mayer-Marton (1897–1960)
 Karl Mediz (1868–1945)
 Emilie Mediz-Pelikan (1861–1908)
 Edgar Meyer (1853–1925)
 Josef Mikl (1929–2008)
 Carl Moll (1861–1945)
 Josef Moroder-Lusenberg (1846–1939)
 Joseph Mössmer (1780–1845)
 Otto Muehl (1925–2013)
 Leopold Müller (1834–1892)

N
 Joseph Nigg (1782–1863)
 Hermann Nitsch (1938–2022)

O
 Joseph Oberbauer (1853–1926)
 Karl O'Lynch von Town (1869–1942)
 Emil Orlík (1870–1932)

P
 Ludwig Passini (1832–1903)
 Elmar Peintner (born 1954)
 Eduard Peithner von Lichtenfels (1833–1913)
 August von Pettenkofen (1821–1889)
 Franz Xaver Petter (1791–1866)
 Adalbert Pilch (1917–2004)
 Max Edler von Poosch (1872–1968)
 Karl Postl (1769–1818)
 August Prinzhofer (1816–1885)
 Erwin Puchinger (1875–1944)
 Norbert Pümpel (born 1956)

Q
 Martin Ferdinand Quadal (1736–1811)

R
 Carl Rahl (1812–1865)
 Arnulf Rainer (born 1929)
 Barbara Rapp (born 1972)
 Josef Rebell (1787–1828)
 Erwin Redl (born 1963)
 Thomas Reinhold (born 1953)
 Maximilian Reinitz (1872–1935)
 Oscar Rex (1857–1929)
 Ferdinand von Řezníček (1868–1909)
 Michael Rieser (1828–1905)
 Alfred Roller (1864–1935)
 Anton Romako (1832–1889)
 Constantin Daniel Rosenthal (1820–1851)
 Utz Rothe (born 1940)
 Johann Michael Rottmayr (1656–1730)
 Franz Rumpler (1848–1922)
 Ferdinand Runk (1764–1834)

S
 Johann Michael Sattler (1786–1847)
 August Schaeffer (1833–1916)
 Albert Schickedanz (1846–1915)
 Egon Schiele (1890–1918)
 Carl Schindler (1821–1842) 
 Emil Jakob Schindler (1842–1892)
 Christoph Schmidberger (born 1974)
 Robert Schöller (born 1950)
 Carl Schuch (1846–1903)
 Paul Schuss (born 1948)
 Hans Schwarz (1922–2003)
 Fritz Schwarz-Waldegg (1889–1942)
 De Es Schwertberger (born 1942) 
 Moritz von Schwind (1804–1871)
 Anna Stainer-Knittel (1841–1915)
 Franz Steinfeld (1787–1868)
 Adalbert Stifter (1805–1868)
 Ernst Stöhr (1860–1917) 
 Josefine Swoboda (1861–1929)
 Rudolf Swoboda (1859–1914)

T
 Bertha von Tarnóczy (1846–1936)
 Josef Eduard Teltscher (1801–1837)

U
 Carola Unterberger-Probst (born 1978)
 Andreas Untersberger (1874–1944)

W
 Aloys Wach (1892–1940)
 Ferdinand Georg Waldmüller (1793–1865)
 Max Weiler (1910–2001)
 Franz West (1947–2012)
 Horst Widmann (born 1938)
 Olga Wisinger-Florian (1844–1926)
 Marie Elisabeth Wrede (1898-1981)
 Michael Wutky (1739–1822/23)

Z
 Carl Wenzel Zajicek (1860–1923)
 Roman Zenzinger (1903–1990)
 Johann Ziegler (1749–1812)
 Alfred Zoff (1852–1927)
 Aloys Zötl (1803–1887)

See also
 List of Austrians
 Lists of artists

Austrian painters
Austrian
Painters